Sharonov may refer to:
Sharonov (surname)
 2416 Sharonov, asteroid
 Sharonov (lunar crater)
 Sharonov (Martian crater)